Lora Storey (born 19 October 1989) is an Australian middle-distance runner. She competed in the women's 800 metres at the 2017 World Championships in Athletics.

References

External links

1989 births
Living people
Australian female middle-distance runners
World Athletics Championships athletes for Australia
Place of birth missing (living people)